Dihoplus is an extinct genus of rhinoceros that lived in Eurasia from the Late Miocene to Early Pleistocene.

They were moderately large rhinoceros, with two horns and large, thick nasal bones. Members of Dihoplus were long placed in Dicerorhinus (which contains the living Sumatran rhinoceros). Sometimes these species are placed in the related Stephanorhinus. The genus is now generally considered distinct, though there is still debate as to which species should be included; for example, Deng (2011) listed Merck's rhinoceros (Stephanorhinus kirchbergensis) under Dihoplus.

References

Miocene rhinoceroses
Pliocene rhinoceroses
Pleistocene rhinoceroses
Miocene mammals of Europe
Miocene mammals of Asia
Pliocene mammals of Europe
Pliocene mammals of Asia
Pleistocene mammals of Europe
Pleistocene mammals of Asia